The Saint Francis Red Flash women's basketball team represents Saint Francis University in Loretto, Pennsylvania, United States.  The school's team currently competes in the Northeast Conference.

History
The Red Flash went to the NCAA Tournament 11 times in a 15 year span from 1996 to 2011. They have been a member of the Northeast Conference in women's basketball since 1988, after one season in the ECAC Metro. They have lost in the First Round of the Tournament each time they have played, with their closest loss being a 51-36 defeat to Villanova in 2003. As of the end of the 2015-16 season, they have a varsity all-time record of 524-587.

NCAA tournament results

References

External links
 

 
Saint Francis Red Flash basketball